Bonnie is a given name, predominantly but not always feminine.

Bonnie may also refer to:

Places
 Bonnie, Illinois, a village
 Bonnie Lake (Alberta), Canada
 Bonnie, West Virginia, an unincorporated community

Other uses
 Bonnie, a character in the Toy Story franchise Toy Story franchise
 Bonnie, an animatronic character from Five Nights at Freddy's
 Bonnie (orangutan) (born 1976), noted for her musical ability in whistling
 Bonnie (TV series) (1995–1996), an American sitcom starring Bonnie Hunt
 Bonnie Field, a privately owned public airport in Marquette County, Michigan
 Bonnie Scotland (horse), an early 20th century thoroughbred racehorse
 St. Bonaventure Bonnies, the sports teams of.St. Bonaventure University
 Tropical Storm Bonnie, name given to several tropical storms
 Triumph Bonneville, a British motorcycle also nicknamed "Bonnie"
 bonnie and bonnie++, free (open-source) file system benchmarking tools for Unix-like operating systems

See also
 
 Bonny (disambiguation)